The 2013–14 season saw Società Sportiva Calcio Napoli compete in Serie A, UEFA Champions League, UEFA Europa League and Coppa Italia. It was the club's 68th season in Serie A.

Players

Squad information

Transfers

In

Total expenditure: €104.65  million

Out

Total revenue: €71.2 million

Net income:  €34.45 million

Pre-season and friendlies

Competitions

Serie A

League table

Results summary

Results by round

Matches

Coppa Italia

UEFA Champions League

Group stage

UEFA Europa League

Knockout phase

Round of 32

Round of 16

Statistics

Appearances and goals

|-
! colspan="14" style="background:#dcdcdc; text-align:center"| Goalkeepers

|-
! colspan="14" style="background:#dcdcdc; text-align:center"| Defenders

|-
! colspan="14" style="background:#dcdcdc; text-align:center"| Midfielders

|-
! colspan="14" style="background:#dcdcdc; text-align:center"| Forwards

|-
! colspan="20" style="background:#dcdcdc; text-align:center"| Players transferred out during the season

Goalscorers

Last updated: 18 May 2014

References

S.S.C. Napoli seasons
Napoli
Napoli
Napoli